The Special Consensus is an acoustic bluegrass group led by banjoist Greg Cahill.

Biography

History
In 1973, graduate student Cahill jammed with other bluegrass musicians at the University of Chicago Folk Festival. They began playing house parties, but in 1975 Cahill and bassist Marc Edelstein decided to pursue a music career for a few years as Special Consensus. The initial line-up included Cahill, Edelstein, Jeremy Raven (mandolin), Jim Iberg (guitar), and Jim Hale (fiddle).

The band name was inspired by a series of books written by Carlos Castenada about rituals of the Yaqui Indians. Special Consensus was a state where spiritual and physical good things physically came together. Plus, a band is a consensus of musicians  providing performance and inspiration.

As of 2021, the Special Consensus membership has included 18 guitarists, 12 bass players, 18 mandolin players, and two fiddlers. Bandleader Greg Cahill has been the one consistent member through the band's history.

Touring
Special Consensus tours frequently across the U.S. Every other year, the band has also toured Ireland and the United Kingdom, through at least 2017.

Bluegrass In Schools
In 1984, The Special Consensus initiated the Traditional American Music (TAM) Program, in which they introduce students and teachers to bluegrass in schools across the country. Cahill estimates TAM has reached approximately one million children.

Special Consensus has also been involved with IBMA's Bluegrass In The Schools (BGIS) program. Cahill has been chairman of the BGIS Committee. He and his wife Jackie wrote a BGIS Implementation manual. In addition, Special Consensus provided the instrumentation for a Discover Bluegrass DVD.

Awards
The group is a two-time Grammy nominee for "Best Bluegrass Album of the Year" for the 2012 album Scratch Gravel Road, and the 2018 album Rivers and Roads.

In 2016, Special Consensus was awarded the IBMA Instrumental Recorded Performance of the Year for their version of "Fireball."

Reunion concerts
Every five years, current and past members of the Special Consensus gather for and perform in an anniversary concert, often at Old Town School of Folk Music in Chicago.

Past members
Alumni of the Special Consensus include:

Discography

Albums
 1979: Special Consensus Bluegrass Band (Tin Ear)
 1983: Blue Northerns (Acoustic Revival)
 1986: Freight Train Boogie (Turquoise)
 1989: A Hole in My Heart (Turquoise)
 1991: Hey Y'All (Turquoise)
 1993: Green Rolling Hills (Turquoise)
 1995: Roads and Rails  (ShyTown)
 1996: Strong Enough to Bend (Pinecastle)
 1998: Our Little Town (Pinecastle)
 2000: 25th Anniversary CD, DVD (Pinecastle)
 2002: Route 10 (Pinecastle)
 2005: Everything's Alright (Pinecastle)
 2007: The Trail of Aching Hearts (Pinecastle)
 2009: Signs (Pinecastle)
 2010: 35 (Compass)
 2012: Scratch Gravel Road (Compass)
 2014: Country Boy: A Bluegrass Tribute To John Denver (Compass) as Special Consensus & Friends
 2016: Long I Ride (Compass)
 2018: Rivers and Roads (Compass)
 2020: Chicago Barn Dance (Compass)

As primary artist/contributor
 2001: various artists - In Memory of a Friend: A Tribute to Randall Hylton (Pinecastle) - track 5, "Thirty-Two Acres of Bottom Land"
 2003: various artists - Blue Ridge Mountain Gospel, Vol. 3 (Pinecastle) - track 8, "When the Walls Come Tumblin' Down"; track 13, "Come Unto Me"
 2003: various artists - Americana Gospel Series, Vol. 1 (Pinecastle) - track 2-09, "New Jerusalem"
 2003: various artists - Pinecastle Christmas Gathering (Pinecastle) - track 16, "Go Tell It on the Mountain"
 2007: various artists - Folksongs Of Illinois #1 (Illinois Humanities Council) - track 1, "Nine Pound Hammer"
 2008: various artists Bluegrass Jamboree DVD (Pinecastle) - track 12, "Silver Dew on the Bluegrass Tonight"; track 13, "Listening to the Rain"; track 14, "Irish Medley"
 2013: various artists - Roanoke: The Music of Bill Monroe (Pinecastle) - track 6, "Strawberry Point"

References

External links 
 
 
 

American bluegrass music groups